The Crozer Theological Seminary was a Baptist seminary located in Upland, Pennsylvania. 

Martin Luther King Jr. was a student at Crozer Theological Seminary from 1948 to 1951, and graduated with a Bachelor of Divinity degree.

In 1970, the seminary merged with the Rochester Theological Seminary, forming the Colgate Rochester Crozer Divinity School in Rochester, New York and the Old Main building was subsequently used as office space by Crozer Hospital (now part of the Crozer-Chester Medical Center.) The Old Main building is a three-story, "F"-shaped, stucco coated stone building with three pavilions connected by a corridor with flanking rooms.  Each of the pavilions is topped by a gable roof and cupola, the largest cupola being on the central pavilion.  The seminary's grounds are now the Crozer Arboretum.

The Old Main building was listed on the National Register of Historic Places in 1973.

History

The Seminary began as the Normal School of Upland, established and built by the president of the board of directors of the American Baptist Publication Society, John Price Crozer.   After the outbreak of the American Civil War, the school was closed.

Crozer allowed the Union army to use the building as a hospital during the Civil War.  The hospital contained a thousand beds and accommodated 300 nurses, attendants and guards.  The patients were almost exclusively Union soldiers except for after the battle of Gettysburg, in July 1863, when the number of wounded and sick Confederate army soldiers left on the battlefield required their acceptance at the hospital.  During the war, more than 6,000 patients were treated.  Many of the dead from the hospital were some of the first burials at nearby Chester Rural Cemetery.

After the war, the building was repossessed by Crozer and subsequently sold to Colonel Theodore Hyatt for usage as the Pennsylvania Military Academy until 1868.

After Crozer's death in 1866, his family converted the school to the Crozer Theological Seminary in his honor.  His son recruited faculty for the new mission.

The seminary served as an American Baptist Church school, training seminarians for entry into the Baptist ministry from 1868 to 1970. 

In 1970 the school moved to Rochester, New York, in a merger that formed the Colgate Rochester Crozer Divinity School. The old seminary building was used as the former Crozer Hospital (now the Crozer-Chester Medical Center).  The building is currently used as administrative offices for the Crozer-Chester Medical Center.

Campus
The multi-acre campus contains the Crozer Arboretum and the following buildings:
Humpstone
President's House
Pollard House
CHEC
Evans House
Crozer Hall
Neisser House
Lewis House
Vedder House
Davis House
Sunnyside House
Westin House
Franklin House

Pearl Hall

Pearl Hall is a serpentine stone library on the campus which opened on June 4, 1871. The building was sponsored by William Bucknell, the benefactor of Bucknell University, in memory of his late wife Margaret Crozer, the daughter of John Price Crozer.  In addition to the $30,000 cost of the building, Bucknell also gave $25,000 for the cost of books and $10,000 for an endowment fund.

Notable alumni
George Barbier, actor
J. Pius Barbour, pastor of Calvary Baptist Church in Chester, Pennsylvania, executive director of the National Baptist Association, editor of the National Baptist Voice, mentor to Martin Luther King Jr., first African-American graduate of Crozer Theological Seminary
John Warren Davis, New Jersey politician and federal judge, taught Greek and Hebrew at Crozer Theological Seminary for three years
William Augustus Jones Jr., minister and civil rights leader
Martin Luther King Jr., Baptist minister and civil rights leader
Samuel D. Proctor, minister, educator and humanitarian

Notable faculty
John Warren Davis, taught Hebrew and Greek for three years
Lemuel Moss, professor of New Testament
James B. Pritchard, taught in the chair of Old Testament History and Exegesis
Henry Clay Vedder, professor of Church history

References

External links

Uplandboro.org history of Crozer theological seminary 
Bulletin of The Crozer Theological Society, Volumes 1-3

1867 establishments in Pennsylvania
American Civil War hospitals
Educational institutions established in 1867
Hospital buildings on the National Register of Historic Places in Pennsylvania
National Register of Historic Places in Delaware County, Pennsylvania
School buildings on the National Register of Historic Places in Pennsylvania
Schools in Delaware County, Pennsylvania
Seminaries and theological colleges in Pennsylvania